Cucumibacter marinus is a Gram-negative, strictly aerobic, rod-shaped bacteria from the genus of Cucumibacter which was isolated from coastal seawater from the Sea of Japan from near the city Busan in Korea. Cucumibacter marinus is the only known species of this genus.

References

External links
Type strain of Cucumibacter marinus at BacDive -  the Bacterial Diversity Metadatabase

Hyphomicrobiales
Bacteria described in 2008